Statistics of First League of Bosnia and Herzegovina in the 1997–98 season.   It was contested only by Bosniak and Croatian clubs.  Serbian clubs played in the 1997–98 First League of the Republika Srpska.

Overview
It was contested by 6 teams. Željezničar have won the championship.

First round

Bosniaks First League

League standings

Results

Top goalscorers

Source: SportSport.ba forum

First League of Herzeg-Bosnia

Clubs and stadiums

League standings

Play-offs

Group stage

Group Sarajevo

Group Mostar

Final

Both clubs qualified for 1998–99 UEFA Cup.

See also
1997–98 First League of the Republika Srpska

References
Bosnia-Herzegovina - List of final tables (RSSSF)

First League of Bosnia and Herzegovina seasons
1997–98 in Bosnia and Herzegovina football
Bosnia